The Sisterhood of the Traveling Pants is a series of five bestselling young adult novels by Ann Brashares: The Sisterhood of the Traveling Pants (2001), The Second Summer of the Sisterhood (2003), Girls in Pants (2005), Forever in Blue (2007), and Sisterhood Everlasting (2011). There is a novel called 3 Willows: The Sisterhood Grows (2009), which explores similar themes and in which the main characters of the other five novels appear as minor characters.

Released by Random House, the novels tell the continuing story of four young girls who acquire a pair of jeans that fit all four of them perfectly, even though they are all different shapes and sizes. The four main characters are Lena Kaligaris, Tabitha "Tibby" Rollins, Bridget "Bee" Vreeland, and Carmen Lowell. Carmen delivers the prologue and epilogue in first person in the first and fifth books and tends to play the role throughout the series of keeping the group of friends together.

The series begins in Bethesda, Maryland with the four girls beginning the summer prior to their junior year in high school, and then follows them through four consecutive summers, finally ending with the summer break following their freshman year of college. During this time the girls develop in various ways, but their ultimate goal is to learn to become individuals whilst maintaining their childhood friendship that makes them whole.  A spin-off novel was released in 2011 and picks up about ten years later, as the girls are about to turn 30.

Adaptations
The first book was made into a movie in 2005, starring Alexis Bledel as Lena, Amber Tamblyn as Tibby, America Ferrera as Carmen, and Blake Lively as Bridget.

The Sisterhood of the Traveling Pants 2, the sequel to the original movie, was released on August 6, 2008.

A film based on the fifth book Sisterhood Everlasting has been announced and will be produced by Alloy Entertainment.

References

Series of books
Young adult novel series
Random House books
Alloy Entertainment
sr:Сестре по Фармеркама